Robert Stephen is a snooker player.

Robert Stephen may also refer to:

Bob Stephen, Canadian football player

See also
Robert Stephens (disambiguation)